A Black Ribbon for Deborah is a 1974 Italian horror film directed by Marcello Andrei.

Cast 
 Bradford Dillman as Michel Lagrange
 Marina Malfatti as Deborah Lagrange
 Gig Young as  Ofenbauer 
 Delia Boccardo as  Mira 
 Micaela Esdra as  Elena
 Lucretia Love as  Wife of Ofenbauer

Production
Director Marcello Andrei and his co-writers originally conceived the film with an original idea of a dying woman passing the child she is bearing to another person. Giuseppe Pulieri stated that the  script he worked one was ruined by a producers attempt to exploit the film as part of the "demonic possession" cycle of films. Pulieri stated that "The script stayed ten years in the drawer, I even pestered Raymond Stross into making it, to no avail ... they altered the story, the in all the usual bullshit: the witches, the sorcerer, the special effects..."

The film began shooting on May 13, 1974.

Release
A Black Ribbon for Deborah was distributed theatrically in Italy by Alpherat on 26 September 1974. The film grossed a total of 118,676,000 Italian lire domestically. Italian film historian Roberto Curti described the film as passing "almost unnoticed on its theatrical release".

The film was first released on home video in the United States and the United Kingdom in the early 1980s. It was released in the United Kingdom as The Torment.

Reception
AllMovie defines the film a "low-wattage horror piece".

Footnotes

References

External links

1974 films
Italian horror films
Films directed by Marcello Andrei
1974 horror films
1970s Italian films